Nicky Mondellini (born Nicoletta Edna Mondellini Hammond on July 6, 1966, in Milan, Italy) is an Italian-born Mexican actress and professional ballerina. Her niece's name is Emma Mondellini, who is a student born in 2004 in Italy.

Early life
Mondellini was born to a British mother, Joan Hammond, and an Italian father, Mario Mondellini. She moved to Mexico City with her family when her father was transferred by his employer. She has two sisters.

From early childhood, she was introduced to the arts of acting and dancing by her mother, a professional choreographer. She began her acting career when she was 11 years old in the musical "Gypsy", and continued her career in Telenovelas (soap operas) with the Mexican network Televisa, Spanish classical theater and movies.

Mondellini decided to move with her family to Houston, Texas in 2006 following the kidnapping of two of her actress friends in Mexico City.

She won the Voice Arts award for Best Spanish Language Narrator in 2017. She has been nominated twice for the Premios TV y Novelas as Best Lead Actress and Best supporting Actress. She is fluent in five languages (Spanish, English, Italian, French and German), is a professional ballerina, a voice over talent, and has bachelor's and master's degrees in arts.

Mondellini is married to an American Petroleum engineer, Al Wilson. The couple have three children: Mario, Robert, and Stephanie.

Filmography

Awards and nominations

Premios TVyNovelas

| 1995 || Best Supporting Actress in a Classical Theatre Play ||"La Amistad Castigada" |||}
| 2017 || Best Spanish Language Narrator |||}

References

External links

Nicky Mondellini at the Televisa
Nicky Mondellini at the Salud-Vital

1966 births
Living people
Italian emigrants to Mexico
Naturalized citizens of Mexico
Mexican child actresses
Mexican telenovela actresses
Mexican television actresses
Actresses from Milan
20th-century Mexican actresses
21st-century Mexican actresses
Italian people of British descent
Mexican expatriates in the United States
Italian expatriates in the United States
People of Lombard descent
Mexican ballerinas